Nils Gaup (born 12 April 1955) is a Sámi film director from Norway.

Career

Gaup was born in Kautokeino, Finnmark County in Northern Norway. He first intended to become an athlete but from 1974 to 1978 he went to drama school and studied at the Beaivváš Sámi Theatre in Kautokeino. He also founded the first Sami language theatre ensemble.

After acting in several movies, he rose to international prominence in 1987 with his film Ofelaš (international English title Pathfinder). It was the first full-length movie with all of the dialogue in Northern Sámi. This movie earned him an Academy Award nomination for Best Foreign language film and the Grand Prize award at the 1990 Yubari International Fantastic Film Festival. After that he made the Disney-financed movie Haakon Haakonsen (Shipwrecked), based on the youth adventure novel Haakon Haakonsen. En norsk Robinson  (Haakon Haakonsen. A Norwegian Robinson) by Norwegian author O. V. Falck-Ytter. In 1993 he shot his most successful film to date Hodet over vannet (Head Above Water). For this film, he won the Amanda Award (the most important Norwegian Film Award). It was remade as a 1996 American film with Cameron Diaz and Harvey Keitel in the leading roles. His next movie was Tashunga (also known as North Star), a project by Christopher Lambert. This film was panned by both the box office and the critics. 

Gaup was previously scheduled as director for the Kevin Costner movie Waterworld. But due to exploding costs, he left the project. 

He directed the 2008 film Kautokeino-opprøret about the Kautokeino rebellion of 1852 of the town of the same name in Norway. It is the true story of the riots of the Sami people against the church and state domination on alcohol sale.

Filmography

Director
Pathfinder (1987) also writer
Shipwrecked (1990) also screenplay
Hodet over vannet (1993), remade as Head Above Water (1996)
Just Do It (1994) short film
North Star (1996)
Misery Harbour (1999)
Deadline Torp (2005) tv-series
The Kautokeino Rebellion (2008) also writer
Journey to the Christmas Star (2012)
Glassdukkene (2014)
The Last King (2016)
Sulis (2022)

Actor
Det andre skiftet (1978) – Olof
Krypskyttere (1982) – Kåre, soldat
Nattseilere (1986) – Gilio
O'Horten (2007) – Same (final film role)

Awards and nominations
Amanda Award Winner – Pathfinder
Academy Award Nomination Best Foreign language film – Pathfinder
Amanda Award Winner – Head above Water

Personal life
Nils Gaup is the uncle of actor Mikkel Gaup.
He is currently married to Linn-Kristin Henriksen, the sister of actor Stig Frode Henriksen known from the Kill Buljo movie.

References

External links

1955 births
Living people
People from Kautokeino
Norwegian Sámi people
Norwegian film directors